The 1970 Montreal Alouettes finished the season in 3rd place in the Eastern Conference with a 7–6–1 record and won the Grey Cup, by defeating another third place team, the Calgary Stampeders in a rain soaked field, which both teams called disgraceful. This was Montreal's second Grey Cup, with the first being in their fourth year of existence in 1949.

Preseason

Regular season

Standings

Schedule

Postseason

Grey Cup

Awards and honours

References

External links
Official Site

Montreal Alouettes seasons
Grey Cup championship seasons
James S. Dixon Trophy championship seasons
1970 Canadian Football League season by team
1970 in Quebec
1970s in Montreal